Vital Alyaksandravich Lanko (Vitali Aleksandrovich Lanko; born 4 April 1977) is a former professional Belarusian footballer.

Career

International career
He made his debut for the national side on 19 February 2004, in friendly match against Romania.

Honours
Dnepr-Transmash Mogilev
Belarusian Premier League champion: 1998

Belshina Bobruisk
Belarusian Cup winner: 2000–01

Match fixing involvement
In July 2020 Lanko was found guilty of being involved in a match-fixing schema in Belarusian Premier League. He was sentenced to 3 years of an open prison (khimiya).

References

External links
 
 

Living people
1977 births
Belarusian footballers
Association football forwards
Belarusian expatriate footballers
Belarus international footballers
Expatriate footballers in Russia
Expatriate footballers in Ukraine
Belarusian expatriate sportspeople in Ukraine
Russian Premier League players
Ukrainian Premier League players
FC Torpedo Mogilev players
FC Dnepr Mogilev players
FC Belshina Bobruisk players
FC Fakel Voronezh players
FC Kristall Smolensk players
FC Volyn Lutsk players
FC Elista players
FC Novokuznetsk players
PFC Spartak Nalchik players
FC Luch Vladivostok players
FC Salyut Belgorod players
FC Chernomorets Novorossiysk players
FC Torpedo-BelAZ Zhodino players
People from Mogilev
Sportspeople from Mogilev Region